, nicknamed Semi, is a current college basketball head coach for Bunri University of Hospitality in Japan and the former head coach for  Noshiro Technical High School and Link Tochigi Brex .

Head coaching record

|- 
| style="text-align:left;"|Link Tochigi Brex
| style="text-align:left;"|2008-09
| 10||3||7|||| style="text-align:center;"|Fired|||-||-||-||
| style="text-align:center;"|
|-

References

1962 births
Living people
Akita Isuzu/Isuzu Motors Lynx/Giga Cats players
Japanese basketball coaches
Utsunomiya Brex coaches
Sportspeople from Akita Prefecture